Fredi may refer to:

 Fredi (Valencian pilota) (born 1957), retired Valencian pilota professional player
 Fredi Bobic (born 1971), German football striker
 Fredi González (born 1964), Cuban current manager of the Atlanta Braves
 Fredi Walker, American actress
 Fredi Washington (1903-1994), African-American film actress
 Fredi (singer), Finnish singer born Matti Kalevi Siitonen

See also

 Federico
 Fred (disambiguation)
 Freddie (disambiguation)
 Freddo
 Freddy (disambiguation)
 Frédéric
 Frederick (given name)
 Frederico
 Fredrik
 Fredro
 Fredy
 Friedrich (disambiguation)
 Fryderyk (disambiguation)